Linx S.A. is a Brazilian management software company and the largest software house in retail management systems in Latin America. According to the American technology consulting firm IDC, Linx retains 40.2% of the retail management software in Brazil. In 2007, Linx was listed for the 3rd time in the Valor 1000 annual report, which lists the 1000 biggest Brazilian companies. In August 2020, payment processor StoneCo merged with Linx's operations in a deal worth $1.1 billion.

History
Linx was founded in 1985 by São Paulo native, Nércio Fernandes. At age 22, Nércio dropped out of college, leaving his studies in Civil Engineering to invest in his own business in the micro-computing field. He and his partners gave the company its first name: Microserv Comércio & Consultoria Ltda.

A few years after its inauguration, the company was serving small businesses in the regions of Brás and Bom Retiro in São Paulo, when MicroMalhas was created – a software geared towards fashion retail. In 1990, the software was renamed Linx, and later became Linx ERP – the group's flagship software, geared towards different retail segments.
Linx Logística, a unit specialized in internal logistics, was created in 2000. With a more complex structure, and with the parallel operation of Linx Sistemas, Linx Logística and Linx Telecom – created to focus on the outsourcing of connectivity and telecommunication options for retail – the creation of a holding company was necessary in order to unify the business units. In 2004, LMI S.A. emerged, and later was renamed Linx S.A.

In 2009, Linx received the contribution of BNDESPar to accomplish acquisitions with the objective of expanding the group's operations.

With the group's expansion, a business division called Linx Prevenção de Perdas was created to minimize losses related to materials, opportunities, time and capital in several of its clients’ market verticals.

Linx relocated in 2011 to a 10-story commercial building in the city of São Paulo. Also in 2011, Linx sealed a partnership and received an investment from General Atlantic – an American private equity fund.

In 2013, Linx adhered to Novo Mercado, a segment of Bovespa that establishes transparency and governance standards through the IPO shares at BM&F.

In the following year, Linx reached R$331.3 million in gross operational revenue, which represented a 27.9% increase compared to 2013.

At its 30th anniversary, in 2015, the company presented a new brand and positioning with the slogan Software that Drives Retail created by FutureBrand, agency responsible for the campaign.

In August 2020, payment processor StoneCo announced that it will be merging its business with Linx in a transaction worth $1.1 billion.

Mergers and acquisitions
In 2008, Linx acquired Quadrant Informática Ltda. for R$39.9 million.

In 2009, Linx Sistemas bought Formata Data Business, located in Belo Horizonte, MG, CSI Comércio Soluções Inteligentes Ltda. for R$41.1 million, and Intercommerce Retail Software for R$13.6 million.

A year later in 2010, the company also bought CNP Engenharia de Sistemas S.A. for R$16 million, and Dia System Informática Ltda. for R$13.8 million.

In 2011, Linx purchased Custom Business Solutions Ltda., valued at R$4.7 million, Spress Informática S.A. for R$29.8 million and Microvix Software S.A. for R$42.8 million.

In 2012, Linx Sistemas acquired Compacta Informática Ltda. for R$46.2 million.

Also in 2012, the company signed a contract for the transfer of technology with Bitix Consultoria em Tecnologia da Informação Ltda. for R$683,000.

In 2013, Linx Sistemas e Consultoria Ltda. signed a Shares Sale and Purchase Contract with the holders of the entire share capital of Direção Processamento de Dados Ltda. estimated at R$26.5 million. In the same year, the company bought Seller Corp Ltda. for R$10.1 million, Opus Software Comércio e Representações Ltda. for R$9 million, Ionics Informática e Automação Ltda. for R$12 million, and LZT Soluções em Informática Ltda. for R$30.5 million.

In 2014, Linx acquired companies such as Rezende Sistemas Ltda., Net4Biz for R$49.9 million, Big Sistemas for R$38.7 million and Softpharma for R$65 million. In the same year, Linx was part of a joint venture with Cielo. This new company was created to offer an integrated management and payment platform for Brazilian small business owners. In November of the following year, the joint venture was dissolved.

In 2015, Linx acquired NEEMU and Chaordic for R$55.98 million. In November 2016, Linx acquired Intercamp Sistemas e Comércio de Informática S/A for R$28 million. Intercamp was active in the commercialization of software development for gas stations and convenience stores. Its first international acquisition expanded the company into Latin America with the purchase of Argentinian Group Synthesis for $16.3 million in July 2017.

In October 2017, Linx acquired Shopback through its subsidiary Linx Sistemas e Consultoria. Shopback is a platform focused on retention technologies through engagement and customer recapture. It is considered to be the leading company in the Brazilian market.
The transaction was worth R$39 million with an additional R$17,56 million depending on the company's financial and operational performance between 2017 and 2019.

Also in the same year, Linx acquired Percycle, technology startup and platform leader in native advertising, for R$13 million. The agreement predicted that the total value of the purchase could reach R$22.73 million in case of reaching financial and operational targets in the 3 years following the purchase.

In March 2018, Linx acquired ITEC Brazil, a company that develops and markets management and automation software for medium and large-sized pharmacies.

The second acquisition of the year occurred in April, when the company acquired the total quotas of Único Sistemas e Consultoria. With the focus on the development of multi-channel management tools and loyalty promotions, this acquisition confirms Linx's investment in systems for relationships between companies and clients.

Social projects

Instituto Ayrton Senna
In partnership with Instituto Ayrton Senna, Linx supports the implementation of the project called Política de Aprendizagem Escolar – "School Learning Policy" that presents educational solutions directed at literacy, such as Se Liga, and at the acceleration of learning for elementary school students in the city of Recife and surrounding area, such as Acelera.

Movimento Arredondar
Linx closed a partnership with Movimento Arredondar – “Round-It-Up Movement”, allowing commercial establishments that use Linx POS, Linx Microvix and Linx Degust systems to offer their consumers the option to round up the cents in their purchases for donation. All proceeds go to selected social organizations that work in favor of UN’s eight objectives for the millennium.

Junior Achievement
Linx reformulated the program by Junior Achievement called Mini-Company, and created Mini-Company by Linx. Mini-Company by Linx provides sophomore students the opportunity to experience economy and business through the operation of a student-run company. The project includes a digital management tool and a virtual community for students and alumni.

Cultural incentives
In 2012, Linx supported the exhibit entitled São Paulo: um novo olhar sobre a história, which portrayed the city through the history of retail commerce and its influence in the urban transformations of the 19th century. The exhibit was featured at the Sé station in São Paulos's subway for 45 days.

Linx also sponsored the book Vitrinas: História, arte e consumo em São Paulo by Sylvia Demetresco, in 2015, which was sent to all of the company's clients as a holiday gift.

Awards and acknowledgements

2017
Top 3 rankings in 7 categories- Latin American Executive Teams from Institutional Investor Magazine
Best Software Provider of Receipt Emission- BR Week
Best POS- Point of Sale- BR Week

2016
Best Software Provider of Receipt Emission- BR Week
Best POS- Point of Sale- BR Week

2015
Best Business Partner- BR Week
Best POS - Point of Sale - BR Week Award
Among the four best in Innovation & Quality, and Social Responsibility – Best of Istoé Dinheiro magazine's award.
Among the four best in the Technology Sector – Software & Service, by IstoÉ Dinheiro magazine.
Among the 200 small and midsize companies with the biggest growth in Brazil, by Exame magazine

2014
First place in the Technology sector: Middle Market Award by - IstoÉ Dinheiro magazine
Third place in the Technology sector – Software & Services: Best of IstoÉ Dinheiro magazine award

2012
Among the 250 companies with the largest growth in the Small and Midsize segment: Exame PME magazine's award

2009
Fifth company with the largest growth in sales, by the annual “200 Largest IT Companies in the Country” award, by Info Exame magazine
Highlight at the annual Computing Today award, as Midsize Software Developers
“The 100 most connected companies of Brazil” by Info Exame magazine

References

External links
 —

Software companies of Brazil
Development software companies
ERP software companies
Companies based in São Paulo
Software companies established in 1985
1985 establishments in Brazil
Brazilian brands
2019 initial public offerings